Making History may refer to:

Making History (TV series), an American comedy television series broadcast on Fox in 2017
Making History (novel), a 1997 science fiction, alternative history novel by Stephen Fry
Making History (play), a 1989 play about Irish history by Brian Friel
Making History (Carolyn See novel), a 1991 novel set in Southern California by Carolyn See
Making History (radio), a BBC Radio 4 programme
Making History (Linton Kwesi Johnson album), 1983
Making History (Screwed Up Click album), a 2005 rap album by Screwed Up Click
Making History: The Calm & The Storm, a 2007 World War II grand strategy computer game
Making History II: The War of the World, a 2010 World War II grand strategy computer game